The Alliance for Water Efficiency is a stakeholder-based 501(c)(3) nonprofit organization dedicated to the efficient and sustainable use of water. The organization serves as a North American advocate for water-efficient products and programs, and provides information and assistance on water conservation efforts. The organization's activities include advocacy, research, and training. The organization received early support from the U.S. Environmental Protection Agency.

Member organizations 
The Alliance's network of members includes over 500 stakeholders (including American Rivers, Kohler Company, Metropolitan Water District of Southern California, Rain Bird, Southern Nevada Water Authority, and TOTO USA) working to improve water efficiency and conservation nationwide.

Awards 
 U.S. Environmental Protection Agency WaterSense Excellence Award for Strategic Collaboration, 2012, 2017, 2018, 2019, and 2021
 U.S. Water Alliance, U.S. Water Prize, 2014
 Universities Council on Water Resources, Education and Public Service Award, 2009

See also 
 Water Efficiency
 Water Conservation
 Water Supply and Sanitation in the United States

References

External links 
 Official website
 Home Water Works (A project of the Alliance for Water Efficiency)
 Financing Sustainable Water (A project of the Alliance for Water Efficiency

Nature conservation organizations based in the United States
Environmental organizations based in Chicago
Water supply and sanitation in the United States